The Centre for Development of Advanced Computing, Thiruvananthapuram (C-DAC(T)) is a branch of the Indian Centre for Development of Advanced Computing based in Thiruvananthapuram. It was previously known as the Electronic Research and Development Center (ER & DCI) and was started as part of science and technology policy of C. Achutha Menon in 1970's.

It is a National Centre of Excellence, pioneering application oriented research, design and development in Electronics and Information Technology.

The centre has contributed to the electronics sector through the indigenous development of systems and products, foreign technology absorption, adaptation and upgrades, consultancy and training and turnkey implementation of contract projects.

Major development groups

Language Technology Section 
This section under the C-DAC is specialized in Indian language speech, natural language processing and assistive technologies.

Major products 
Malayalam speech synthesis add-on for NVDA
Malayalam Automatic Speech recognition system
Indian Language handwriting recognition system
Mithram an android application for people with ALS or for those which difficulty in speech.

Power Electronics Group 
Power Electronics is a part of industrial control and is a major thrust area for C-DAC. The activities of the group are focused on Custom Power Devices, Power Controllers for tapping energy from non-conventional energy sources like wind and solar, Electric and Hybrid Vehicles, Automotive Electronics, Systems for Industrial Automation, Digital Controllers and Power Control Systems for Industrial application, Networking of Power Electronic systems and the Development of industrial control products like Variable Speed Drive systems, High Performance Uninterruptible Power Supply systems, High efficiency Switched Mode Power Converters, and Remote Controlled Mobile platforms.

In addition to technology development projects, the group undertakes contract projects for industries. The centre also acts as the nodal centre for the National Mission on Power Electronics Technology (NaMPET).

National Mission on Power Electronics Technology (NaMPET) 
NaMPET is a national mission programme launched in November 2004 by the Department of Information Technology (DIT) under Ministry of Communications & Information Technology, Government of India. The five-year programme is implemented through the Nodal Centre at the Centre for Development of Advanced Computing. Academic institutions in the country, manufacturing industries and user industries of Power Electronics Systems participate in the programme. A National Steering Committee composed of experts from agencies and institutions in India guides the activities of NaMPET.

Major technologies 
Vehicle Control Unit and Train Communication Network for Indian Railways
Universal Auxiliary Converter for Rolling Rolling Stock Applications
Smart Energy Meters for Advanced Metering Infrastructure
Low Voltage Direct Current (LVDC) Architecture for various applications

Broadcast and Communication Group
The group is involved in the design and development of products and technology for Broadcast and Communication applications.

The group has launched a range of products/technology in the last decade which have been used by All India Radio, Doordarshan, State Electronics Development Corporations, Airport Authority & Telecommunication Department.

The group has expertise in product development with mixed mode signal processing for embedded application and is involved in developing products in Digital Audio, Broadband Access, TETRA, Wi-MAx, VOIP, Bluetooth and Digital Mobile Radios.

Hardware Design Group
The Application Specific Integrated Circuit (ASIC) Design Centre is an embedded centre of the Centre for Development of Advanced Computing, set up with the objective of application-oriented R&D for electronics products, systems and technologies. Since its inception in 1989, the ASIC Design Centre has been active in the design of high-complexity ASICs and ASIC-based products. The centre is equipped with facilities for design of VLSI ASICs from concept to silicon.

Hardware Design Group was part in development of VEGA Microprocessors. These are high performance processors  based on the open source RISC-V Instruction Set Architecture.

Strategic Electronics Group
Strategic Electronics Group (SEG) has a team of 50 with skill sets for embedded product / system design. This group has acquired in house competence for total product design and technology transfer for ready to market products. This group has state of the art infrastructure and tools to support the design and development activity in the embedded product development and digital signal processing, including total package design. Main products from SEG are Echo sounder, Bottom profiler, Remotely Operated Submersible, Water level sensor, Side scan sonar, MRI, Sounds, SWAMS, Under Water Ranges etc.

Main products are PEARS (Programmable platform for Experiments and Academic Research on SDR)
Echosounder
EMLOG
UDMS
SWAMS
SOUNDS
MRI
Landmine Detection System
Gunshot Detection System
Remotely Operated Submersible
Precision Water Level Sensor
NDT Systems
ACOTO

Control and Instrumentation Group
The thrust area of the group is the application oriented research and development activity relating to Control and Instrumentation. Communication being very important for effective control, plant wide networking is also added to the thrust area of the group.

Medical Informatics Group
'Medical Informatics' is the application of computer technology to medicine such as health care, medical research and medical teaching.

The mission of 'Medical Informatics' is to carry out research on health technology, telemedicine, bio-medical imaging and applications relevant to environments in developing countries.

 Medical Informatics: core activities
 Tele-Medicine
 Hospital Management System
 Hospital Information System
 Data Management System for health care
 Data mining and Knowledge Management System for health care
 Medical Protocol implementation
 Picture Archival and Communication System
 Bio-Medical Signals and Imaging research
 Human Resource Portal & Payroll Management
 Public Health Informatics
 Hand-held Environments for health care
 Embedded systems for health care
 National Health Care Technology initiatives
 Industrial and Consumer Electronics Consultancy
 Mobile Telemedicine vehicle design

Core technical capability 
 Languages and technologies: C, C++, .NET, Java, Java EE, JSP, STRUTS, PHP, JavaScript, HTML, XML, XSL, CSS, AJAX, Java ME, WAP, Delphi & Embedded C.
 Middleware: Oracle Application Server 10g & JBoss
 Web-related technologies
 Centralized and distributed technologies.
 Open Source software: Redhat Linux, BOSS, Open Office and TOMCAT
 Network communication technologies: V-SAT, Broadband, GSM, GPRS, WLL and Wi-Fi
ICD
 Medical image and signal processing technologies
 Knowledge Management & Data Mining Tools

Knowledge Resource Centre
Knowledge Resource Centre (KRC) is a major division of C-DAC. R&D and advanced technology training are the two major areas of focus which have resulted in development of products such as open source software, multilingual tools, and different training courses.

The courses offered includes Diploma in Cyber Security & Forensics, Diploma in Web Technologies and Diploma in Embedded Systems & IoT in addition to the Certificate courses on IBM Mainframe, Web Technology, Database Technology, Internet Technology, Cyber Security & Forensics, Ethical Hacking and E-Governance.

KRC is located at three places. Two places in Thiruvananthapuram at Vellayambalam & Technopark and the third is near to Shenoy's Junction, MG Road, Ernakulam (Kochi). KRC, Technopark Campus offers various short term courses and placement oriented diploma programs which includes Cyber Forensics and IoT. Kochi Centre is majorly concentrating on IT courses like, Dot NET Technologies using MVC, Java, Advanced Java, Java and Android Programming, PHP, C programming, C++ programming etc. The centre is located at the prime location and at the heart of the city, Ernakulam. Reach-ability by train and bus is very high. KRC also undertake corporate course for different offices on their requirements. KRC provides guidance on final projects and In-plant training to students.

ER & DCI Institute of Technology

ER&DCI Institute of Technology (ER&DCI IT) is an educational institution under the direct control of Centre for Development of Advanced Computing (CDAC), Thiruvananthapuram. The institute is located on the campus of CDAC, in the heart of Thiruvananthapuram city. The institute is affiliated to the Kerala Technological University and has the approved by All India Council for Technical Education (AICTE).

ER&DCI IT began in 2001, with the MCA Programme with the motive of imparting training in Information Technology and other related areas through the three year MCA programme. The programme was structured with differences from the regular MCA programmes offered by other institutes. Hands on experience of live projects at the R & D laboratories of CDAC is aimed at preparing the students to take up work in the industry. MCA has been discontinued, the last batch will pass out in 2014.

Academic programmes

Postgraduate Programmes

Masters in Technology (M.Tech)
VLSI & Embedded Systems
Computer Science with Specialization in Cyber Forensics and Information Security

Admissions
Admissions to the M.Tech. courses are made through the GATE (graduate aptitude test in engineering).

Footnotes

References
 NaMPET Official website
 RCCF Official website

External links
 C-DAC(C-DAC Pune
 C-DAC Thiruvananthapuram
 ER&DCI(IT)
 NAMPET
 C-DAC Bangalore
 C-DAC Kolkata
 C-DAC Mumbai
 C-DAC Noida
 NRCFOSS India(C-DAC Chennai)

See also
 List of engineering colleges in Kerala

Information technology research institutes
Research institutes in Thiruvananthapuram
Health informatics organizations
E-government in India
Year of establishment missing